Ole Paus was a Norwegian iron and steel wholesale company, founded by the businessman and industrialist Ole Paus in Christiania in 1872. After his retirement, the company was known as Ole Paus Eftf. (Ole Paus' Successors) and owned by his son Christopher Blom Paus and grandson Per Paus. 

The company operated until around 1970. 

Its founder Ole Paus was the grandfather of General Ole Otto Paus and the great grandfather of singer-songwriter, author, poet and actor Ole Paus).

Literature
Norsk engroshandel, Norges grossistforbund, 1948
Svend Bay-Schmith and O.R. Dahl (eds.): Næringslivets menn i Norden : biografisk håndbok over ledere av skandinaviske firmaer, Eckardts bokhandel, 1950

Defunct manufacturing companies of Norway
Steel companies of Norway
Paus family
Norwegian companies established in 1872
Transport companies established in 1872